Myroslav Valentynovych Mazur (born 11 August 1998) is a Ukrainian footballer who plays as a centre-back.

Career

Before the second half of the 2016/17 season, after playing for the reserves of Dynamo Kyiv, Mazur signed for Bukovyna in the Ukrainian second division, where he made 4 league appearances.

In early 2019, Mazur was loaned to Moldovian side Sfîntul Gheorghe, where he made 20 appearances and scored 2 goals and was called up to represent Ukraine U21.

Before the 2020 season, he signed for Swedish side Umeå FC.

On 2 February 2021, Mazur signed for Jagiellonia Białystok in Poland.

Honours
Sfîntul Gheorghe
Moldovan Cup: Runner-Up 2018–19

References

External links

 
 

Living people
Footballers from Kyiv
1998 births
Ukrainian footballers
Ukrainian expatriate footballers
Association football defenders
FC Sfîntul Gheorghe players
FC Arsenal Kyiv players
FC Vorskla Poltava players
FC Bukovyna Chernivtsi players
FC Dynamo-2 Kyiv players
Jagiellonia Białystok players
Umeå FC players
Ekstraklasa players
Ukrainian First League players
Superettan players
Ukrainian expatriate sportspeople in Poland
Ukrainian expatriate sportspeople in Sweden
Ukrainian expatriate sportspeople in Moldova
Expatriate footballers in Sweden
Expatriate footballers in Poland
Expatriate footballers in Moldova